Pierre-François-Victor Foucault (1797–1871) was the inventor in 1843 of the first printing machine for braille, the decapoint.

Life 
A pupil of the Institut National des Jeunes Aveugles, Foucault married Thérèse-Adèle Husson, a blind author, in 1826. This marriage gave birth to two daughters. After his wife's death in 1831, following a fire, he married a seamstress (non blind) in 1832, Adélaïde Louise Juteau. This allowed him to become a resident of the Quinze-Vingts (marriages between blind people were prohibited), which gave him the financial possibility to collaborate with Louis Braille.

The raphigraphe 
His invention was awarded a platinum medal by the Société d'encouragement pour l'industrie nationale, then he showed it at The Great Exhibition (1851) in London.

References

External links 
 Louis Invents Decapoint

1797 births
1871 deaths
19th-century French inventors
Braille technology